Sensenbrenner Park is a  park in downtown Columbus, Ohio, United States. The park was dedicated on September 18, 1980, and commemorates former mayor Jack Sensenbrenner.

See also
 List of parks in Columbus, Ohio

References

External links

 

1980 establishments in Ohio
Downtown Columbus, Ohio
Parks in Columbus, Ohio
Protected areas established in 1980
High Street (Columbus, Ohio)